Allan Franklin Larsen (April 4, 1919 – March 2, 2005) was an American Republican politician from Eastern Idaho who served as a member of both chambers of the Idaho Legislature. He was the Republican nominee in the 1978 Idaho gubernatorial election.

Early life and education 
Born in Preston, Idaho, he attended Utah Agricultural College (now Utah State University) in Logan.

Career 
Larsen operated a potato farm near Firth in Bingham County. First elected to the state legislature in 1966, he served six terms in the Idaho House of Representatives, the last two as speaker. He was the Republican nominee in the 1978 Idaho gubernatorial election, but was defeated by the Democratic incumbent, John Evans of Malad.

Larsen returned to private life on his farm for a 12 years. Following his first wife's death and his remarriage to Alva Lu Hebdon, he returned to the legislature when he was elected to the Idaho Senate in 1990 and the House of Representatives in 1992 and 1994.

Personal life 
Larsen died in Bingham County, Idaho at age 85 in 2005; he and his first wife Barbara (1920–1990) are buried at the Riverside Thomas Cemetery in Blackfoot.

References

External links

1919 births
2005 deaths
20th-century American politicians
Republican Party Idaho state senators
Speakers of the Idaho House of Representatives
Republican Party members of the Idaho House of Representatives
Latter Day Saints from Idaho
Farmers from Idaho
Utah State University alumni